OrCam devices such as OrCam MyEye are portable, artificial vision devices that allow visually impaired people to understand text and identify objects through audio feedback, describing what they are unable to see.

Reuters described an important part of how it works as "a wireless smartcamera" which, when attached outside eyeglass frames, can read and verbalize text, and also supermarket barcodes. This information is converted to spoken words and entered "into the user’s ear." Face-recognition is also part of OrCam's feature set.

Devices
OrCam Technologies Ltd has created three devices; OrCam MyEye 2.0, OrCam MyEye 1, and OrCam MyReader.

OrCam My Eye 2.0:                
 OrCam debuted the second-generation model, the OrCam MyEye 2.0 in December 2017.                                       
 About the size of a finger, the MyEye 2.0 is battery-powered, and has been compressed into a self-contained device.
 The device snaps onto any eyeglass frame magnetically.
 Orcam 2.0 is smaller and lighter (only 22.5 grams/0.8 ounces) with more functionality to restore independence to the visually impaired.

Clinical Studies
JAMA Ophthalmology:
In 2016 JAMA Ophthalmology conducted a study involving 12 legally blind participants to evaluate the usefulness of a portable artificial vision device (OrCam) for patients with low vision. The results showed that the OrCam device improved the patient's ability to perform tasks simulating those of daily living, such as reading a message on an electronic device, a newspaper article or a menu.

Wills Eye:
Wills Eye was a clinical study designed to measure the impact of the OrCam device on the quality of life of patients with End-stage Glaucoma. The conclusion was that OrCam, a novel artificial vision device using a mini-camera mounted on eyeglasses, allowed legally blind patients with end-stage glaucoma to read independently, subsequently improving their quality of life.

Employee testing
The New York Times described how a pre-release OrCam device was used by a Coloboma-impaired employee of the device's developer in 2013 for grocery shopping. It was the small size of the prototype rather than the functionality that gave her added mobility in an Israeli store's aisles.

Added life-enhancement was described: "to both recognize and speak .. bus numbers ..
traffic lights."

Social aspects
In contrast to an early version of Google Glass, which "failed ... because .. Glass wearers were ..mocked,", early OrCam devices used designs that "clip unobtrusively on your shirt or perhaps your belt."

In addition, it does not record sounds or images, what was called "the privacy puzzle that stumped Google.

One 2018 technology reviewer wrote that he wished it had a headphone jack "so it would be less disruptive in places where others are working." An attempt was made to use bone conduction.

USA introduction
In 2018 a team headed by New York Assemblyman Dov Hikind introduced use of OrCam devices to ten individuals screened for what he termed "new Israeli technology that really makes a difference to the blind."

Although not the first USA success, it was more focused than a publicly funded project that was authorized in 2016 by a California government agency. Also in 2016 the Chicago Lighthouse for the Blind demonstrated its use.

Technology
In the area of hardware, miniaturization has been quite important, but one major area, software, was mentioned by Assemblyman Hikind, and reported by The Times of Israel
 is the "AI-driven algorithms" that "reports .. how many people are in a room.

In addition to reading printed text, it can also aid in "seeing" what is on a television or computer screen. Although OrCam can't help with handwritten information, it can reuse information, the basis of recognizing "US currency, and even faces."

Features
While early language support was for English, French, German, Hebrew and Spanish, others now available include Danish, Dutch, Finnish, Italian, Norwegian, Portuguese and Swedish.

History
OrCam Technologies Ltd was founded in 2010 by Professor Amnon Shashua and Ziv Aviram. Before co-founding OrCam, the two in 1999 co-founded Mobileye, an Israeli company that develops vision-based advanced driver-assistance systems (ADAS) providing warnings for collision prevention and mitigation, which was acquired by Intel for $15.3 billion in 2017.
OrCam launched OrCam MyEye in 2013 after years of development and testing, and began selling it commercially in 
2015.

In its early years, the company raised $22 million, $6 million of which came from Intel Capital. By 2014, Intel, which was also investing in Google Glass, had invested $15 million in Orcam. In March 2017, OrCam had raised $41 million in capital, making it worth $600 million.

Marketing
One outcome of initial marketing in the USA was that they "reached a deal with the California Department of Rehabilitation, ...qualifying blind and visually impaired state residents."

OrCam Technologies Ltd
OrCam Technologies Ltd. is the Israeli-based company producing these OrCam devices, which are wearable artificial intelligence space. The company develops and manufactures assistive technology devices for individuals who are visually impaired, partially sighted, blind, print disabilities, or have other disabilities. OrCam headquarters is located in Jerusalem, operating under the company name OrCam Technologies Ltd.

OrCam has over 150 employees, is headquartered in Jerusalem, and has offices in New York, Toronto, and London.

Awards
 2018 Last Gadget Standing Winner 
 2018 CES Innovation Awards Honoree in Accessible Tech
 2017 NAIDEX Innovation Award 
 2016 Louise Braille Corporate Recognition Award
 2016 Silmo-d-Or Award

See also 

 Nipro
 NxStage

 ApiJect Systems
 Vacuactivus

References

External links
 
 OrCam Facebook page
 
 Foundation Fighting Blindness website
 National Center for Health Statistics website

Blindness equipment
Computer vision
Products introduced in 2013
Medical device manufacturers
Companies based in Jerusalem
Israeli inventions
Hebrew University of Jerusalem
Israeli companies established in 2010
Wearable computers